Genduara punctigera is a species of moth of the  family Lasiocampidae. It is found in the south-east quarter of Australia.

The wingspan is about 50 mm.

The larvae feed on Exocarpus cupressiformis.

References

Lasiocampidae
Moths of Australia
Moths described in 1855